Madonna and Child is an oil on panel painting by Cima da Conegliano, created in 1500, now in the National Museum of Wales in Cardiff. 

This painting depicts the Madonna with a white veil on her head and the Child in her arms. At the base of the work, the marble parapet bears the artist's signature on a cartouche; in the background on the right there is a small Turkish knight.

References

Cardiff
1500 paintings
Paintings in the collection of National Museum Cardiff